Virginio is a given name, and may refer to:

 Virginio Cáceres (born 1962), Paraguayan footballer
 Virginio Colombo (1885–1927), Italian architect
 Virginio Ferrari (born 1952), Italian motorcycle racer
 Virginio Ferrari (artist) (21st century), Italian sculptor
 Virginio Livraghi (21st century), Italian comic strip artist and illustrator
 Virginio Orsini (circa 1434 – 1497), Italian condottiero
 Virginio Orsini (cardinal) (1615–1676), Italian cardinal
 Virginio Rognoni (1924–2022), Italian politician
 Virginio Rosetta (1902–1975), Italian former football player
 Virginio Vespignani (1808–1882), Italian architect

See also

 Virginia (disambiguation)